The Bemidji State Beavers women's ice hockey team represented Bemidji State University and participated in the Western Collegiate Hockey Association. This was the Beavers final season in the John S. Glas Field House. For the 2010–11 season, the Beavers will move into the Bemidji Regional Events Center. Bemidji State doubled their win production compared to the 2008–09 season, when the Beavers claimed only six victories.

Offseason
May 11: The Beavers signed two more players to National Letters of Intent, joining the four that were inked during the early signing period in November 2008. All six players will play for BSU in fall 2009. Molly Arola and Jamie Hatheway have both inked with BSU during the spring signing period. They join early signees Sadie Lundquist, Mackenzie Thurston, Keirstin Visser and Erika Wheelhouse.
May 19: Head coach Steve Sertich announced that senior Franny Dorr, senior Jackie Robertson  and junior Erin Cody have been selected as captains for the upcoming 2009-10 campaign. All three players will wear the C on their sweater for the first time in their careers. All three participated in 36 games during the previous season.
September 9: The WCHA announced that Bemidji State goaltender Zuzana Tomčíková, has been named as a WCHA All-Star. She is among 22 players from the conference to face the 2009–10 U.S Women’s National Team in St. Paul, Minn. on September 25.

Regular season

Standings

Roster

Schedule

Player stats

Skaters

Goaltenders

Postseason

February 27: Bemidji State ends its 14 game playoff losing streak in a 2-1 victory over St. Cloud State.
February 28: By defeating St. Cloud State in Game 3, the Beavers advance to the WCHA Final Face-Off for the first time in school history. Zuzana Tomčíková had 27 saves and the win was the Beavers 12th win of the season. It ties the school record for most wins in a season (accomplished in 2001-02). The Beavers will now play the Minnesota Duluth Bulldogs in the WCHA semi-finals. In the two playoff wins, Annie Bauerfeld had four points (two goals and two assists) to lead the team in points. Montana Vichorek's three points (one goal and two assists) ranked second.

WCHA Final Faceoff
Semifinals

Notes
Freshman Erika Wheelhouse assisted on the final goal for her fourteenth on the season. Her number ranked second on the team.
Erin Cody scored her 20th goal of the season in the loss to the Bulldogs. Her 33 points (20 goals, 13 assists) was the best of her NCAA career. In the all-time ranks, she is tied for third all-time with 36 career goals.
Senior Jackie Robertson finished her NCAA career by playing in 144 games. She shares the record with her former teammate Brooke Collins.

Awards and honors
Steve Sertich, WCHA Coach of the Year 
Zuzana Tomčíková, WCHA Defensive Player of the Week (Week of October 12)
Zuzana Tomčíková, WCHA Defensive Player of the Week (Week of November 9)
Zuzana Tomčíková, WCHA Co-Defensive Player of the Week (Week of January 20)
Zuzana Tomčíková, Patty Kazmaier Award nominee
Zuzana Tomčíková, Co-WCHA Player of the Year
Erika Wheelhouse, Bemidji State, WCHA Rookie of the Week (Week of January 11)

References

External links
Official site

Bemidji State
Bemidji State Beavers women's ice hockey seasons